Illinois Gateway Amendment may refer to:

 Illinois Gateway Amendment (1946)
 Illinois Gateway Amendment (1950)